Lesbophobia comprises various forms of prejudice and negativity towards lesbians as individuals, as couples, or as a social group. Based on the categories of sex, sexual orientation, identity, and gender expression, this negativity encompasses prejudice, discrimination, hatred, and abuse; with attitudes and feelings ranging from disdain to hostility. Lesbophobia is misogyny that intersects with homophobia, and vice versa.

Terminology
The first usage of the term lesbophobia listed in the Oxford English Dictionary is in The Erotic Life of the American Wife (1972), a book by Harper's Bazaar editor Natalie Gittelson. While some people use only the more general term homophobia to describe this sort of prejudice or behavior, others believe that the terms homosexual and homophobia do not adequately reflect the specific concerns of lesbians, because they experience the double discrimination of both homophobia and sexism.

Extent
The idea that lesbians are dangerous—while heterosexual interactions are natural, normal, and spontaneous—is a common example of beliefs which are lesbophobic. Like homophobia, this belief is classed as heteronormative, as it assumes that heterosexuality is dominant, presumed, and normal, and that other sexual or relationship arrangements are abnormal and unnatural. A stereotype that has been identified as lesbophobic is that female athletes are always or predominantly lesbians. Lesbians encounter lesbophobic attitudes not only in straight men and women, but from gay men, as well as bisexual people. Lesbophobia in gay men is regarded as manifest in the perceived subordination of lesbian issues in the campaign for gay rights.

Anti-lesbian violence
Lesbophobia is sometimes demonstrated through crimes of violence, including corrective rape and even murder. In South Africa, Sizakele Sigasa (a lesbian activist living in Soweto) and her partner Salome Masooa were raped, tortured, and murdered in July 2007 in an attack that South African lesbian-gay rights organizations, including the umbrella-group Joint Working Group, said were driven by lesbophobia. Two other rape/murders of lesbians occurred in South Africa earlier in summer 2007: Simangele Nhlapo, member of an HIV-positive support group, was raped and murdered in June, along with her two-year-old daughter; and Madoe Mafubedu, aged 16, was raped and stabbed to death.

In 2006, Zoliswa Nkonyana, aged 19, was killed for being openly lesbian by four men in the Cape Town township of Khayelitsha, who stabbed and stoned her to death. Banyana Banyana soccer player Eudy Simelane and LGBT activist Noxolo Nogwaza were raped and murdered in the Gauteng township of KwaThema. Zanele Muholi, community relations director of a lesbian rights group, reports having recorded 50 rape cases over the past decade involving black lesbians in townships, stating: "The problem is largely that of patriarchy. The men who perpetrate such crimes see rape as curative and as an attempt to show women their place in society."

In its 2019 annual report, SOS Homophobie found that anti-lesbian violence increased 42 percent in France in 2018, with 365 attacks reported.

Erotic plasticity and sexual fluidity 

Some argue that since sexual orientation change efforts aimed at women often include rape, they are worse than those aimed at men. Others suggest that the notion of female erotic plasticity is wishful thinking on the part of men who want to have sex with lesbians, and should be criticized for not being objective.

See also

 Corrective rape
 Compulsory heterosexuality
 Heterosexism
 History of lesbianism
 Lesbian erasure
 Lesbianism in erotica
 Biphobia
 Societal attitudes toward homosexuality
 Violence against LGBT people

References

Further reading

News, magazine, website

 
 
 
 
 
 
 
 
 
 
 
 

Books

 
 

Academia

External links
  Lesbophobia definition by the European Institute for Gender Equality
  Violence against lesbians: education, research, public campaigns (Project Number: 2000-021-W). DAPHNE project. European Commission, 2000.
  Violence Against Lesbians: Education – Research – Public Relation (Final Report). DAPHNE Programme. European Commission, 31 December 2001.
  Lesbians visibility and lesbophobia in France. SOS Homophobie, 2014.
  Breaking the Silence: Criminalisation of Lesbians and Bisexual Women and its Impacts. Human Dignity Trust, May 2016.
  In Some Countries, Being Gay Or Lesbian Can Land You In Prison...Or Worse. Radio Free Europe/Radio Liberty, 2020.

 
Lesbian history
Lesbianism
Homophobia
Phobias
Prejudice and discrimination by type
Misogyny
Violence against women
LGBT and society
Anti-LGBT sentiment
Discrimination against LGBT people